The 1950 National Football League Draft was held January 20–21, 1950, at the Bellevue-Stratford Hotel in Philadelphia. With the league absorbing the Baltimore Colts, Cleveland Browns, and San Francisco 49ers from the All-America Football Conference, these three teams were combined with the other NFL clubs in a single ranking to determine the order of the draft.

This was the fourth year that the first overall pick was a bonus pick determined by lottery, with the previous three winners (Chicago Bears in 1947, Washington Redskins in 1948, and Philadelphia Eagles in 1949) ineligible from the draw; it was won by the Detroit Lions, who selected end Leon Hart.

Player selections

Round one

Round two

Round three

Round four

Round five

Round six

Round seven

Round eight

Round nine

Round ten

Round eleven

Round twelve

Round thirteen

Round fourteen

Round fifteen

Round sixteen

Round seventeen

Round eighteen

Round nineteen

Round twenty

Round twenty-one

Round twenty-two

Round twenty-three

Round twenty-four

Round twenty-five

Round twenty-six

Round twenty-seven

Round twenty-eight

Round twenty-nine

Round thirty

Hall of Famers
 Art Donovan, defensive tackle from Boston College taken in the 3rd round of the 1950 AAFC dispersal draft by the Baltimore Colts.
Inducted: Professional Football Hall of Fame class of 1968.
 Leo Nomellini, tackle from Minnesota taken 1st round 11th overall by the San Francisco 49ers.
Inducted: Professional Football Hall of Fame class of 1969.
 Ernie Stautner, defensive tackle from Boston College taken 2nd round 22nd overall by the Pittsburgh Steelers.
Inducted: Professional Football Hall of Fame class of 1969.
 Bud Grant, end from Minnesota taken 1st round 14th overall by the Philadelphia Eagles.
Inducted: Professional Football Hall of Fame class of 1994 as a coach, not a player.
 Lou Creekmur, tackle from William & Mary taken in the 2nd round of the 1950 AAFC dispersal draft by the Detroit Lions.
Inducted: Professional Football Hall of Fame class of 1996.

Notable undrafted players

References

External links
 NFL.com – 1950 Draft
 databaseFootball.com – 1950 Draft
 Pro Football Hall of Fame

National Football League Draft
Draft
NFL Draft
NFL Draft
1950s in Philadelphia
American football in Philadelphia
Events in Philadelphia